Contacto – Magazine Informative super Interlingua is a publication of the British Interlingua Society (BIS). It was established in July 1994 in response to increased interest in the auxiliary language Interlingua. Its editor is F. P. Gopsill. Contacto, published every four months in English and parallel Interlingua-English texts, includes articles, information, explanations, and a question-response feature.

The BIS also publishes Lingua e Vita. While Lingua e Vita is primarily an informational magazine, Contacto has a more personal feel and is chiefly a means to keep in touch with people involved in the Interlingua movement and language.

References

External links
 Contacto – super Interlingua
 Gopsill, F. P. 100 Editiones Britannic. Historia de Interlingua: Communication Sin Frontieras, 2001, revised 2006.

1994 establishments in the United Kingdom
Interlingua publications
Magazines established in 1994
Quarterly magazines published in the United Kingdom